CSDB is an acronym that can stand for several different things:

Colorado School for the Deaf and Blind
Commercial Standard Digital Bus
Common Source Data Base
Central Securities Database
Carbohydrate Structure Database